The 1975 Arizona State Sun Devils baseball team represented Arizona State University in the 1975 NCAA Division I baseball season. The Sun Devils played their home games at Packard Stadium, and played as part of the Western Athletic Conference. The team was coached by Jim Brock in his fourth season as head coach at Arizona State.

The Sun Devils reached the College World Series, their seventh appearance in Omaha, where they finished in third place after winning games against Cal State Fullerton, eventual champion Texas, and semifinalist , and losing a pair of games to eventual runner-up South Carolina.

Personnel

Roster

Coaches

Schedule and results

References

Arizona State Sun Devils baseball seasons
Arizona State Sun Devils
College World Series seasons
Arizona State Sun Devils baseball